Proložac is a municipality in Split–Dalmatia County, Croatia. In the census of 2011 it had a population of 3,802, in the following settlements:
 Donji Proložac, population 1,511
 Gornji Proložac, population 346
 Postranje, population 1,390
 Ričice, population 231
 Šumet, population 324

It borders Herzegovina and some Croatian municipalities such as Imotski and Lovreć.

References

External links 

Populated places in Split-Dalmatia County
Municipalities of Croatia